Makkinavarigudem is a village of T. Narasapuram mandal in West Godavari district in the state of Andhra Pradesh, India.

Demographics 
 Census of India, Makkinavarigudem had a population of 4735. The total population constitute, 2373 males and 2362 females with a sex ratio of 995 females per 1000 males. 449 children are in the age group of 0–6 years, with sex ratio of 952. The average literacy rate stands at 66.54%.

References

Villages in West Godavari district